CINOA (Confédération Internationale des Négociants en Oeuvres d'Art, or International Confederation of Art and Antique Dealers' Associations) is a Brussels-based international federation, founded in 1935, of antique and art dealers, representing five thousand dealers from thirty-two art and antique associations in twenty-two countries. 

Membership is limited to associations which require their members to adhere to extremely strict quality and expertise standards. Dealers who are affiliated with CINOA through their art and antique trade associations often display the CINOA logo as support of the CINOA charter and guidelines.

The stated goals of CINOA are to:
 Encourage high ethical standards within the trade
 Disseminate practical information on the art market
 Facilitate legitimate circulation of artworks throughout the world

Since 1976, CINOA has been awarding a yearly CINOA Prize to art historians or major art market players "in recognition of an academic publication or a remarkable contribution to furthering the cultural preservation through art works in a CINOA member country".

References

External links 

Associations of art dealers